Judge Matthews may refer to:

Annabel Matthews (1883–1960), judge of the United States Board of Tax Appeals
Burnita Shelton Matthews (1894–1988), judge of the United States District Court for the District of Columbia
Clifton Mathews (1880–1962), judge of the United States Court of Appeals for the Ninth Circuit

See also
Justice Matthews (disambiguation)